Iniquity is moral injustice, wickedness or sin. It may refer to:

 Iniquity (band), a Danish death metal group established in 1989
 Iniquity, a 2008 album by the American deathcore band Catalepsy

See also